The 2003 MuchMusic Video Awards were held 22 June 2003 and featured performances by
Avril Lavigne, Disturbed, Michelle Branch, Our Lady Peace, Sam Roberts, Sean Paul, Simple Plan, and Ashanti.

Best Video
 Our Lady Peace – "Innocent"
 Matthew Good – "In a World Called Catastrophe"
 Shawn Desman – "Get Ready"
 Swollen Members featuring Nelly Furtado - “Breath”
 Treble Charger – "Hundred Million"

Best cinematography
 Our Lady Peace – "Innocent"
 Chantal Kreviazuk – "Time"
 Rascalz f. Notch & Sazon Diamante – "Crazy World"
 Theory of a Deadman – "Nothing Could Come Between Us"
 Treble Charger – "Hundred Million"

Best Director
 Treble Charger – "Hundred Million"
 Matthew Good – "In a World Called Catastrophe"
 Our Lady Peace – "Innocent"
 Remy Shand – "Rocksteady"
 Shawn Desman – "Get Ready"

Best French Video
 Daniel Bélanger – "Dans un spoutnik"
 Corneille – "Ensemble"
 Les Cowboys Fringants – "En Berne"
 Les Marmottes Aplaties – "Gagner"
 Vulgaires Machins – "Comme une brique"

Best Independent Video
 Not By Choice – "Now That You Are Leaving"
 Alexisonfire – "Pulmonary Archery"
 Sam Roberts – "Brother Down"
 Swollen Members f. Nelly Furtado – "Breathe"
 The Salads – "Get Loose"

Best International Video – Artist
 Sean Paul – "Gimme The Light"
 50 Cent – "In Da Club"
 Ashanti – "Happy"
 Beyoncé – "Work It Out"
 Christina Aguilera – "Beautiful"
 Eminem – "Without Me"
 Eminem – "Cleaning Out My Closet"
 Justin Timberlake – "Cry Me a River"
 Missy Elliott – "Work It"
 Nelly – "Hot in Herre"

Best International Video by a Canadian
 Avril Lavigne – "Sk8er Boi"
 Avril Lavigne – "I'm With You"
 Lillix – "It's About Time"
 Simple Plan – "Addicted"
 Sum 41 – "Still Waiting"

Best International Video – Group
 The White Stripes – "Seven Nation Army"
 Audioslave – "Cochise"
 Coldplay - “In My Place”
 Disturbed – "Prayer"
 Good Charlotte – "The Anthem"
 Linkin Park – "Somewhere I Belong"
 The Music – "Take the Long Road and Walk It"
 Queens of the Stone Age – "Go with the Flow"
 System of a Down – "Boom!"
 Weezer – "Keep Fishin'"

Best Pop Video
 Shawn Desman – "Get Ready"
 Chantal Kreviazuk – "In This Life"
 In Essence – "IE"
 Remy Shand – "Rocksteady"
 Sam Roberts – "Brother Down"

Best Post Production
 Danko Jones – "Lovercall"
 BrassMunk ft. Ivana Santilli & Karmel Klutch – "El Dorado"
 Matthew Good – "In a World Called Catastrophe"
 Our Lady Peace – "Innocent"
 Treble Charger – "Hundred Million"

MuchLOUD Best Rock Video
 Treble Charger – "Hundred Million"
 Not By Choice – "Now That You Are Leaving"
 Our Lady Peace – "Innocent"
 Simple Plan – "I'd Do Anything"
 Theory of a Deadman – "Nothing Could Come Between Us"

MuchMoreMusic Award
 Shania Twain – "Up!"
 Blue Rodeo – "Bulletproof"
 Celine Dion – "I Drove All Night"
 Chantal Kreviazuk – "Time"
 Remy Shand – "Rocksteady"

MuchVIBE Best Rap Video
 Swollen Members f. Nelly Furtado – "Breathe"
 BrassMunk – "Big"
 Dirty Circus (Sweatshop Union) – "The Truth We Speak"
 k-os – "Superstarr"
 Rascalz ft. Notch & Sazon Diamante – "Crazy World"

People's Choice – Favourite Canadian Artist
 Avril Lavigne
 Chantal Kreviazuk
 Matthew Good
 Sam Roberts
 Shawn Desman

People's Choice – Favourite Canadian Group
 Simple Plan
 Our Lady Peace
 Sum 41
 Swollen Members
 Theory of a Deadman

People's Choice – Favourite International Artist
 Eminem
 50 Cent
 Christina Aguilera
 Justin Timberlake
 Nelly

People's Choice – Favourite International Group
 Good Charlotte
 Coldplay
 Linkin Park
 Red Hot Chili Peppers
 The White Stripes

VideoFACT Award
 Sam Roberts – "Brother Down"

Performers
Ashanti – Rock Wit U (Awww Baby)
Avril Lavigne – Losing Grip
Disturbed – Prayer
Michelle Branch – Are You Happy Now
Our Lady Peace – Innocent
Sam Roberts – Don't Walk Away Eileen
Sean Paul – Get Busy
Simple Plan – I'd Do Anything

References
Citations

MuchMusic Video Awards
MuchMusic Video Awards
MuchMusic Video Awards
2003 in Canadian music